Nicaise Mulopo Kudimbana (born 21 January 1987) is a Congolese professional footballer who plays as a goalkeeper for Sint-Eloois-Winkel.

Career
On 21 December 2007, Anderlecht saved the rights on him after he had played one season for Union Saint-Gilloise, after the season returned in July 2009 back to R.S.C. Anderlecht. On 31 August 2011, his contract with Anderlecht was terminated by mutual agreement. On 2 September 2011, it was announced that Kudimbana had signed a one-year contract with his former club Cercle Brugge. Following the 2011–12 season, Kudimbana moved to Belgian Second Division team Oostende.

In January 2014, Kudimbana joined former club Anderlecht on loan from Oostende for the rest of the season. Despite not playing a match in that time Anderlecht signed him up permanently in June 2014.

Ahead of the 2019–20 season, Kudimbana joined Wallonia Walhain. Kudimbana had also received an offer earlier that year to become a goalkeepers coach at his former club Anderlecht, where his childhood friend Vincent Kompany had just arrived as player-coach.

On 31 March 2020, Kudimbana moved to RCS Brainois. In July 2020 he signed with Roeselare, but because the club went bankrupt a few months later, he never made an official appearance for the West Flemish club. He only found a new club with Sint-Eloois-Winkel in January 2021. Later that year he also started working as a goalkeepers coach in the youth department of Léopold FC.

International career
He made his first cap for Congo DR national football team against Algeria on 26 March 2008 and is former member of the Belgium U-21.

Honours

Club
Anderlecht
 Belgian Super Cup: 2014

National
DR Congo
Africa Cup of Nations bronze: 2015

References

External links
 

1987 births
Living people
Footballers from Brussels
Belgian footballers
Belgium under-21 international footballers
Citizens of the Democratic Republic of the Congo through descent
Democratic Republic of the Congo footballers
R.S.C. Anderlecht players
Democratic Republic of the Congo international footballers
Association football goalkeepers
Belgian sportspeople of Democratic Republic of the Congo descent
Royale Union Saint-Gilloise players
Cercle Brugge K.S.V. players
K.V. Oostende players
Royal Antwerp F.C. players
R. Wallonia Walhain Chaumont-Gistoux players
K.S.V. Roeselare players
Sint-Eloois-Winkel Sport players
Belgian Pro League players
Challenger Pro League players
2015 Africa Cup of Nations players
2017 Africa Cup of Nations players
Black Belgian sportspeople